In mathematics, the Herzog–Schönheim conjecture is a combinatorial problem in the area of group theory, posed by Marcel Herzog and Jochanan Schönheim in 1974.

Let  be a group, and let

be a finite system of left cosets of subgroups

Herzog and Schönheim conjectured
that if  forms a partition of  
then the (finite) indices  cannot be distinct. In contrast, if repeated indices are allowed, then partitioning a group into cosets is easy: if  is any subgroup of 

Subnormal subgroups
In 2004, Zhi-Wei Sun proved an extended version

and hence

where  denotes the set of prime

Mirsky–Newman theorem
In this case, the Herzog–Schönheim conjecture states that every covering system, a family of arithmetic progressions that together cover all the integers, must either cover some integers more than once or include at least one pair of progressions that have the same difference as each other. This result was conjectured in 1950 by Paul Erdős and proved soon thereafter by Leon Mirsky and Donald J. Newman. However, Mirsky and Newman never published their proof. The same proof was also found independently by Harold Davenport and Richard Rado.

In 1970, a geometric coloring problem equivalent to the Mirsky–Newman theorem was given in the Soviet mathematical olympiad: suppose that the vertices of a regular polygon are colored in such a way that every color class itself forms the vertices of a regular polygon. Then, there exist two color classes that form congruent polygons.

References

Combinatorial group theory
Conjectures
Unsolved problems in mathematics